The  Nippon Professional Baseball season ended with the Yakult Swallows defeating the Osaka Kintetsu Buffaloes in the 2001 Japan Series 4 games to 1.

Standings

Central League

Pacific League

Japan Series

Yakult Swallows (4) vs. Osaka Kintetsu Buffaloes (1)

League leaders

Central League

Pacific League

See also
2001 Major League Baseball season

References